Rúnar Sigtryggsson (born 7 April 1972) is an Icelandic handball player who competed in the 2004 Summer Olympics.

References

1972 births
Living people
Runar Sigtryggsson
Runar Sigtryggsson
Handball players at the 2004 Summer Olympics